Paphinia cristata is a species of the orchid genus Paphinia and the type species of this genus. It is endemic to northern South America and the island of Trinidad. Its 1 to 3 flowered pendant inflorescence carries large, deep-red flowers. The species was published in 1843 in Edwards's Botanical Register 29: misc. page 14.

Distribution and habitat 
Paphinia cristata is found in Panama, Colombia, Venezuela, Guyana, Suriname, French Guiana and Trinidad at altitudes from sea level up to 1000 m, in damp forest.

Cultivation 
Paphinia cristata prefers warm, moist, shaded, humid conditions. Never allow plants to dry out for long periods. Mount on pieces of coconut, tree fern or cork with a pad of moss around the roots.

References

External links 

 

cristata
Flora of northern South America
Orchids of Colombia
Orchids of French Guiana
Orchids of Guyana
Orchids of Panama
Orchids of Suriname
Orchids of Trinidad
Orchids of Venezuela